Blackwall is a Docklands Light Railway (DLR) station in Blackwall area of Poplar in London, England. It is located very close to the northern entrance to the Blackwall road tunnel under the River Thames. The station is on the Beckton branch of the DLR between Poplar and East India stations.

The DLR station opened, with the Beckton Branch, on 28 March 1994. There was a previous station very close to this site, called Poplar station, which was served by the London and Blackwall Railway from 6 July 1840 to 3 May 1926. Poplar station was along the route of Aspen Way just to the south and east of the DLR station. Blackwall station on the London and Blackwall Railway was actually farther east, on what is today Jamestown Way. A crossover west of the station allows trains from Beckton and Poplar to reverse here.

Connections
London Buses route 15 serves the station.

References

External links

Docklands Light Railway website – Blackwall station page
Map of Poplar, 1885.

Docklands Light Railway stations in the London Borough of Tower Hamlets
Railway stations in Great Britain opened in 1994
Poplar, London